Gowjeh Qaleh may refer to:
Gowjeh Qaleh, Charuymaq
Guyjeh Qaleh (disambiguation)